The Phó Đáy River is a river in Vietnam. It flows for 200 kilometres through Bắc Kạn Province, Tuyên Quang Province and Vĩnh Phúc Province.

References

Rivers of Bắc Kạn province
Rivers of Tuyên Quang province
Rivers of Vĩnh Phúc province
Rivers of Vietnam